Joseph "Joey" Tramontana (born 15 February 1997) is an Italy international rugby league footballer who plays as a  for the Blacktown Workers Sea Eagles for the Intrust Super Premiership.

He represented Italy at the 2017 World Cup.

Early years
Born in Sydney, New South Wales, Australia, Tramontana is of Italian descent. He played his junior rugby league for the Marconi Mustangs and attended Patrician Brothers College. He played for Patrician Brothers in the 2014 GIO Schoolboy Cup, winning the Peter Sterling Medal as player of the tournament.

Playing career

Early career
Tramontana played in the Parramatta Eels' Harold Matthews Cup team, and represented NSW at under-16 level in 2013. From 2016 to 2017, Tramontana played for the Canterbury-Bankstown Bulldogs in the National Youth Competition, captaining the team in 2017.

In 2016, Tramontana represented Italy in their World Cup qualifying campaign. The following year, he played in their 2017 World Cup squad.

References

External links
Canterbury Bulldogs profile
2017 RLWC profile
Italy profile

1997 births
Living people
Australian rugby league players
Australian people of Italian descent
Blacktown Workers players
Italy national rugby league team players
Rugby league hookers
Rugby league players from Sydney
Western Sydney University alumni